Osvaldo Fernández Rodríguez (born November 4, 1968) is a former Cuban professional baseball player who pitched in the Major Leagues from - and -. He was a member of the Cuban baseball team, which won a gold medal at the 1992 Summer Olympics in Barcelona, Spain. On July 29, 1995, Fernández defected when Cuba played the United States in Millington, Tennessee.

Fernández also pitched for Holguín in the Cuban National Series.

See also

 List of baseball players who defected from Cuba

External links

 

1968 births
Living people
Major League Baseball pitchers
San Francisco Giants players
Cincinnati Reds players
Major League Baseball players from Cuba
Cuban expatriate baseball players in the United States
Tacoma Rainiers players
Phoenix Firebirds players
San Jose Giants players
Fresno Grizzlies players
Ottawa Lynx players
Chattanooga Lookouts players
Louisville RiverBats players
Defecting Cuban baseball players
Olympic baseball players of Cuba
Olympic gold medalists for Cuba
Olympic medalists in baseball
Medalists at the 1992 Summer Olympics
Baseball players at the 1992 Summer Olympics
Pan American Games gold medalists for Cuba
Baseball players at the 1991 Pan American Games
Baseball players at the 1995 Pan American Games
Pan American Games medalists in baseball
Goodwill Games medalists in baseball
Competitors at the 1990 Goodwill Games
Medalists at the 1995 Pan American Games
Cuban expatriate baseball players in Mexico
Cuban expatriate baseball players in Canada
Olmecas de Tabasco players
Diablos Rojos del México players
People from Holguín